Mary V. Seeman, OC, FRCPC, is a Canadian psychiatrist who is Professor Emerita in the Department of Psychiatry at the University of Toronto. She served as the Tapscott Chair in Schizophrenia from 1997 to 2000.

Seeman is a psychiatrist who has written on gender influences on outcome in schizophrenia, women in schizophrenia, and the impact of parenting with a mental illness.

Selected publications

Books

 Trove

Personal life 
She is married to scientist Philip Seeman. Mother to Marc, Bob, and Neil Seeman, and grandmother to Ahron, Geoff, Ciara, David, Ronan, and Dori.

As a child, Mary fled Nazi-occupied Poland with her family via Portugal and settled in Canada.

References 

Canadian medical researchers
Academic staff of the University of Toronto
Living people
Year of birth missing (living people)
Officers of the Order of Canada